Panther Branch is a  long 2nd order tributary to Hyco Creek in Caswell County, North Carolina.

Course
Panther Branch rises in Morgans Pond about 1 mile north of Prospect Hill, North Carolina, and then flows northerly to join Hyco Creek about 1.5 miles west-southwest of Frogsboro.

Watershed
Panther Branch drains  of area, receives about 46.5 in/year of precipitation, has a topographic wetness index of 376.53, and is about 45% forested.

References

Rivers of North Carolina
Rivers of Caswell County, North Carolina
Tributaries of the Roanoke River